Temporary maintenance holdings
Brazil
Road transport in Brazil